Cenchreae or Kenchreai, also Cenchreiae or Kenchreiai (Κεγχρειαί), was a town in ancient Argolis, south of Argos, and on the road from the latter city to Tegea. Pausanias says that it was to the right of the Trochus (τρόχος), which must not be regarded as a place, but as the name of the carriage road leading to Lerna. Near Cenchreae Pausanias saw the sepulchral monuments of the Argives, who conquered the Lacedaemonians at Hysiae.

Its site is located near modern Palaio Skafidaki.

References

Populated places in ancient Argolis
Former populated places in Greece